Lone Peak, a mountain peak southeast of Salt Lake City, Utah, United States is the center of the Lone Peak Wilderness, established in 1978. The first person in recorded history to successfully hike Lone Peak was Richard Bell, Sr. of Riverton, Utah. Richard also lead the first recorded climb of the Lone Peak Cirque. He went on to lead several expeditions and taught the first guides. Bell Canyon is still a common route to the summit, and was named after Richard Bell Sr. following his historic climb. Lone Peak consists almost entirely of quartz monzonite (a granitoid, or granite-like) rock of the 30.5 million year old Little Cottonwood Stock. Quartzite and limestone are also found in distal locations on the mountain. The mountain from Little Cottonwood Canyon on the northern end to Corner Canyon on the southern end is called "Mount Jordan", the highest peak of which is Lone Peak, with other lower peaks being Enniss Peak and Bighorn Peak. The Peak ranks 98th on a list of Utah peaks with  topographic prominence.

Hiking/Backpacking

It is possible to reach the summit in one long day, but rock climbers often camp at the base of the summit and non-climbers often camp lower on the Jacob's Ladder Trail. There are a few streams that dry up before summer, so water must be carried in.  There is reputedly a spring that runs year-round.

Jacob's Ladder Trail
It is located near a large turnout on the right side of the road and three 4-wheel drive tracks climbing the road bank on the north side of the road. In 2007, the turnout was accompanied by a wooden fence leading to the starting point of the trail. Round trip mileage is about 11.1 miles with 5,603 feet of vertical gain.

Draper Ridge Trail
The Draper Ridge Trail is currently inactive. The trail is in a deteriorated condition, as the top of the trail is very exposed to weather. Towards the bottom, thick undergrowth prevents passage.  The Jacob's Ladder Trailhead is just up the road. The Jacob's Ladder Trail overlaps the Draper Ridge Trail for the last 2/3 of the way to the peak.

Cherry Canyon Logging Trail
The route gains altitude in the beginning, going through a steep scrub oak section. After a few hours of hiking, things change as the trail levels off and veers north into the trees crossing the water of cold springs in bear canyon. The trail climbs out of the drainage on the north side into a new drainage, but stays generally below the ridge line. The trail eventually opens into a meadow with a small cabin in the large pine trees. The trail continues up above the cabin to the southeast and crosses over to the south into another drainage at a low point on the ridge. The southeast top of the new drainage meets up with the main granite drainage running roughly north-south which leads to the Lone Peak Cirque via stacked rock cairns. An alternate route is to roughly follow the stream bed up the drainage until the top of the ridge that runs roughly north-south above a granite drainage is reached. Round trip mileage is about 16 miles with 6,876 feet of vertical gain.

Outlaw Cabin 

Construction was completed in 1967 prior to the area being designated as a wilderness area. The cabin has three cots, a pot belly stove, cabinets, and two small windows. It is built from trees downed in the area and the roof is lined with plastic and dirt/grass for insulation. All the materials besides the trees were hauled to the location by horseback. The cabin is partially hidden by large trees. In October 1997, a Draper family was caught in a blinding snow storm and took shelter in the cabin until they were rescued. There is a journal in the cabin that visitors can add their stories to.

Deaths on Lone Peak
 December 15, 1936 - Seven died when a Western Air Express Boeing 247 crashed just below Hardy Ridge on Lone Peak. The major parts of the aircraft were hurled over the ridge and fell over a thousand feet into a basin below.
 July 25, 2002 - Two hikers were struck by lightning near the summit of Lone Peak while they were trying to seek shelter.
 September 8, 2015 - A woman fell 200–300 feet near the cirque. Her body was found the next day.
June 17, 2017 - An extreme trail runner fell about 500 feet near Bighorn Peak while approaching Lone Peak.

Movie Rocks
 The 1968 film The Devil's Brigade was filmed in Utah. The attack on a Nazi mountain stronghold in Italy was filmed on the lower part of this peak's mountain at a place called "Movie Rocks". The trail leading there is just to the west of the Jacob's Ladder trail.

Images

References

External links

 
 Lone Peak. Climb-Utah.com.
  Hiking to Lone Peak Summit. Utahwild.com.
 Lone Peak Hiking Directions. UtahPictures.com
 Hiking Lone Peak. by Hyrum Wright.

Mountains of Utah
Mountains of Salt Lake County, Utah
Mountains of Utah County, Utah
Wasatch Range